Lamine Mili is an American electrical engineer from Virginia Tech in Blacksburg, Virginia. He was named a Fellow of the Institute of Electrical and Electronics Engineers (IEEE) in 2016 for his contributions to robust state estimation for power systems.

References 

Fellow Members of the IEEE
Living people
21st-century American engineers
Virginia Tech faculty
Year of birth missing (living people)
American electrical engineers